Elonkerjuu is a Finnish folk rock band. The band had started in the mid-1990s with lead singer Lauri Tähkä and was known from 1996 until 2011 as Lauri Tähkä & Elonkerjuu. They were signed since 2006 with Universal Music Finland. In 2011 Tähkä left the band, which shortened their name to the current form. In 2012 Juha Lagström was chosen as the new lead singer. The current singer is Osku Ketola, who has been in the band since 2017.

Lauri Tähkä and Elonkerjuu

During the first years, the band based its songs on traditional music from Southern Ostrobothnia. Later, they started to write the lyrics by themselves, but the themes are still connected to rural life and the language used is Southern Ostrobothnian dialect.

Lauri Tähkä & Elonkerjuu 2006 album Maailma on renki went platinum. The next album, Tuhannen riemua got a gold record on the date of its publication, and double platinum in ten weeks. Until early 2008, that album has sold over 80,000 copies.

Elonkerjuu
In March 2011 the singer Lauri Tähkä announced that the band's career is over. Later the rest of the band announced that they will continue under the name Elonkerjuu and in January 2012 Juha Lagström was chosen as their new vocalist. Johanna Koivu left the band on 2017 and Osku Ketola entered as a lead singer and a violinist.

Discography

Albums 
as Lauri Tähkä & Elonkerjuu

as Elonkerjuu

Singles 
as Lauri Tähkä & Elonkerjuu
(Charting in The Official Finnish Charts)

Others (including promotional singles / EPs)

as Elonkerjuu

DVDs 
as Lauri Tähkä & Elonkerjuu
 2007: Kerjuuvuodet 2000–2007

Videos
as Lauri Tähkä & Elonkerjuu
 2000: Martinlunnin Jukka
 2004: Papukaija
 2006: Maailma on renki
 2007: Pauhaava sydän
 2008: Rakasta rintani ruhjeille
 2009: Suudellaan
 2009: Kylkeen kyhnytä
 2010: Suojaan kaikelta

as Elonkerjuu
 2012: Viistäköön siipeni maata
 2012: Surun ja ilon kaupunki

See also
 List of best-selling music artists in Finland

References

External links 

 Home page
 Iltalehti (news of the platinum albums)

Finnish rock music groups
1995 establishments in Finland
Musical groups established in 1995